Spodra is a Latvian feminine given name. The associated name day is January 4.

References 

Latvian feminine given names
Feminine given names